The description Paris of the East has been applied to a large number of locations, including:

 Baku, Azerbaijan
 Beirut, Lebanon
 Bucharest, Romania
 Budapest, Hungary
 Esfahan, and Tehran, Iran
 Hanoi, Vietnam
 Irkutsk, Russia
 Istanbul, Turkey
 Jaipur, India
 Kabul, Afghanistan
 Lahore, Pakistan
 Manila, Philippines
 Prague, Czech Republic
 Riga, Latvia
 Ross Island, India
 Saigon, Vietnam (more known as the Pearl of the East)
 Saint Petersburg, Russia
 Shanghai, China
 Warsaw, Poland

See also
 Paris of the West
 Paris of the North
Paris of the South
Paris of the plains
 Paris of the Prairies
Little Paris (disambiguation)

References

City nicknames
Culture of Paris
Asian culture
Paris of the East